The episodes for the twelfth season of the anime series Naruto: Shippuden are based on Part II for Masashi Kishimoto's manga series. It was directed by Hayato Date, and produced by Pierrot and TV Tokyo. The season follows Naruto Uzumaki controlling the power of the Nine-Tails with the help of Killer Bee at the start of the Fourth Shinobi World War, episodes 257 to 260 being a recap of the events of the Part I storyline. The season aired from January to August 2012. 

The English dub of the season aired for Neon Alley on May 24, 2014 to January 3, 2015. The season would make its English television debut on Adult Swim's Toonami programming block and premiere from March 31 to November 17, 2019. 

The DVD collection was released on October 3, 2012 under the title of
.

The season contains five songs between two openings and three endings. The first opening theme, "newsong" by tacica, is used from episode 243 to 256. The second opening theme,  by The Cro-Magnons, is used from episode 257 to 275. The first ending theme,  by Hemenway, is used from episodes 243 to 256. The second ending theme,  by UNLIMITS, is used from episodes 257 to 268. The third ending theme,  by AISHA, is used from episode 269 to 275. The sixth feature film, "Road to Ninja: Naruto the Movie" was released on July 28, 2012. The broadcast versions of the episodes 271 to 275 include scenes from the film in the opening themes, while retaining the music "Totsugeki Rock".


Episode list

Home releases

Japanese

English

References
General

Specific

2012 Japanese television seasons
Shippuden Season 12